Cultural Geographies is a quarterly peer-reviewed academic journal covering research and commentaries on the cultural appropriation and politics of nature, environment, place, and space. The journal was established in 1994 as Ecumene, name changed in 2002. It is published by SAGE Publications and edited by Dydia DeLyser.

Abstracting and indexing 
Cultural Geographies is abstracted and indexed in Scopus and the Social Sciences Citation Index. According to the Journal Citation Reports, its 2015 impact factor is 2.095, ranking it 14th out of 77 journals in the category "Geography" and 27th out of 104 in the category "Environmental Studies".

References

External links
 

SAGE Publishing academic journals
Quarterly journals
English-language journals
Publications established in 1994
Environmental social science journals
Environmental humanities journals
Geography journals
Cultural geography